The San Antonio River (Mexico) is a river of Mexico. On June 23, 1881, 200 people were killed and 40 injured as a train fell into the river when the Puente de Escontzin collapsed in the Morelos railway accident near Cuautla, Morelos.

See also
List of rivers of Mexico

References

Atlas of Mexico, 1975 (http://www.lib.utexas.edu/maps/atlas_mexico/river_basins.jpg).
The Prentice Hall American World Atlas, 1984.
Rand McNally, The New International Atlas, 1993.

Rivers of Mexico